Adopted as Holograph is the eponymous debut studio album by Adopted as Holograph. Recorded in 2011/2012 at Green Door Studios in Glasgow, the album was released in January 2013.

Track listing

Personnel 
 David Philp - Vocals, Guitars
 Andrew Gifford - Double bass, Backing vocals
 Tom Pettigrew - Violin
 Caroline Hussey - Accordion, Backing vocals
 Ryan Buchanan - Guitar, Backing vocals
 Chris Houston - Drums (tracks 1, 3-7)
 Iban Perez - Drums, Trumpet (track 2)
 Jamie Bolland - Metallophone (track 2)
 Engineers: Emily Maclaren, Stuart Evans
 Recorded at: Green Door Studios, Glasgow, Scotland
 Cover design: Adopted as Holograph

External links 
 Adopted as Holograph

References 

2013 debut albums